The Legend of the Condor Heroes is a Hong Kong television series first broadcast on TVB Jade in 1983. A total of 59 episodes were produced.

Episodes

The Iron-Blooded Loyalists (鐵血丹心)

The Eastern Heretic and Western Venom (東邪西毒)

The Duel on Mount Hua (華山論劍)

References

External links
 

Lists of Chinese drama television series episodes
Television episodes set in China